The Evorsk vole (Microtus evoronensis) is a species of rodent in the family Cricetidae.
It is found only in Russia.  They are stout rodents with short ears, legs and tails.  These animals live in grassy areas where they eat green vegetation such as grasses and sedges in summer, and grains, seeds, roots and bark at other times.

References

Musser, G. G. and M. D. Carleton. 2005. Superfamily Muroidea. pp. 894–1531 in Mammal Species of the World a Taxonomic and Geographic Reference. D. E. Wilson and D. M. Reeder eds. Johns Hopkins University Press, Baltimore.

Microtus
Mammals described in 1980
Mammals of Russia
Taxonomy articles created by Polbot